Zanoni is an unincorporated community in Gloucester County, in the U. S. state of Virginia.

White Hall was added to the National Register of Historic Places in 1984.

References

Unincorporated communities in Virginia
Unincorporated communities in Gloucester County, Virginia